A wild river (United States, Australia, & New Zealand) or heritage river (Canada) is a :river or a river system designated by a government to be protected and kept "relatively untouched by development and are therefore in near natural condition, with all, or almost all, of their natural values intact."

Within some nation states including in the United States of America, Canada, New Zealand, and the Commonwealth of Australia, governments have opted to focus on rivers and river systems as a kind of "unmodified or slightly modified" landscape feature to protect, manage and preserve in near 'natural' condition – variously labeling or formally declaring such areas to be "wild rivers" (or "heritage rivers").

The term "wild river" may also more generically describe or identify s without dams.

Concerns about the term
Where rivers or river systems may be labeled 'wild rivers' with the intention of protecting them to a Wilderness (IUCN Category 1b) standard, the International Union for the Conservation of Nature (IUCN) warns:

Most recently, in Australia, following some declarations, and in the lead up to a number of other 'wild river declarations using Queensland's wild rivers legislation, Australia's Human Rights and Equal Opportunity Commission observed:

Wild rivers by country

Australia

In 1979, Tasmania's Hydro-Electricity Commission released a proposal to dam and inundate the Gordon and Franklin Rivers, leading the Tasmanian Wilderness Society and other conservation groups to mobilize one of Australia's largest conservation battles and acts of civil disobedience, focused heavily on "...the protection of the Franklin River, one of Australia’s last truly wild rivers..." resulting in the river being World Heritage listed (as part of the Tasmanian Wilderness world heritage area) and a subsequent Australian High Court decision preventing the damming of this wild river.

The then Prime Minister of Australia, in December 1992, gave a 'Statement on the Environment' speech committing the Commonwealth of Australia to identifying all of Australia's near-pristine rivers and to encouraging government agencies plus Australian peoples generally to more effectively protect and manage those rivers as total catchments. This commitment translated into the establishment of an Australian Heritage Commission Wild Rivers Project:

By 1998 the Australian Heritage Commission's Wild Rivers Project, working in cooperation with all states, had produced maps identifying Australia's wild rivers across all of the Commonwealth's States, plus "Conservation Guidelines for the Management of Wild River Values".

Queensland identified an initial 19 rivers to be protected as wild rivers and, in September 2005, opted to enact "Australia’s first comprehensive and stand alone legislation to identify, protect and preserve that State’s remaining wild rivers". In 2007, Queensland declared its first wild rivers within the Gulf of Carpentaria, as well as at Fraser Island, and Hinchinbrook Island and in April 2009 a further three wild river areas have been declared in Cape York Peninsula.

Australia's Wilderness Society (who find their early origins in the original Tasmanian Franklin Wild River campaign), also chose to renew and re-initiate its wild river campaigning "...to seek government action around a Wild Rivers framework building on the Australian Heritage Commission’s earlier work...", being an ongoing campaign as follows:

In January 2010, the Queensland Wild Rivers Act 2005 became the subject of national interest when federal Opposition leader Tony Abbott announced a plan to 'overturn' the Act through a proposed Wild Rivers Environmental Management Bill. This legislation intended to insert a provision in the Queensland Act, granting Indigenous titleholders a right to consent to this one regulation. The introduction of the Wild Rivers (Environmental Management) Bill to both houses of federal parliament in 2010 and 2011 led to a series of parliamentary inquiries, though in October 2011, Queensland Liberal National Party candidate Campbell Newman indicated he planned to 'axe' the legislation if elected. Elected in March 2012, Newman subsequently announced he would eventually replace the Wild Rivers Act solely in Cape York Peninsula under a Bio-Regional Management Plan anticipated in October 2013.

Canada

Canada has been described as follows:

In 1984 Canada's federal, provincial and territorial governments established a Canadian Heritage Rivers System as Canada's national river conservation program – to conserve and protect the heritage values and integrity of the best examples of Canada's large, free flowing rivers and river systems.

Canada's river conservation program was not established by statute, but is instead a cooperative arrangement between Canada's ten provinces and three territories establishing a fifteen-member (appointed) Canadian Heritage Rivers board, to which participating members nominate rivers to be designated as heritage rivers, for which river management plans building on existing statutory powers are prepared, agreed, and endorsed.

The French River in Ontario was the first river to be designated a heritage river, in 1986, and since then 40 rivers have been designated across Canada:

New Zealand

Through to the 1970s in New Zealand a conservation movement formed around a number of largely unprecedented campaigns "...to save wild river landscapes..." including particularly campaigns to prevent damming of the Clutha River, damming of the Motu River, and raising the waters of Lake Manapouri (with the Save Manapouri Campaign now regarded as a key milestone in New Zealand environmental protection, and the Lake itself ultimately ending up in the Te Wahipounamu World Heritage Area).

These wild river campaigns led, in 1981, to the passing of a Wild and Scenic Rivers legislation and, in 1984, to the Motu River becoming New Zealand's first "Wild and Scenic River". Since then 14 other wild rivers have been protected in accordance with New Zealand's Wild Rivers legislation (with 'Water Conservation orders' being made), and in 2009 conservation groups have initiated a renewed and reinvigorated national scale "wild rivers" campaign with the following rationale:

United States

Following a Presidential Commission reviewing the outdoor recreational resources of the United States of America, the United States Congress passed the Wild and Scenic Rivers Act in October 1968, creating a National Wild and Scenic Rivers System as follows:

See also
 Canadian Heritage Rivers System
 List of National Wild and Scenic Rivers
 National Wild and Scenic Rivers System

References

Further reading
Australia
 Altman, Jon. 2011. Wild Rivers and Indigenous Economic Development In Queensland, CAEPR Topical Issue No. 6. Canberra, ACT: Centre for Aboriginal Economic Policy Research, Australian National University.
 McLoughlin, Meg, and Melissa Sinclair. 2009. Wild Rivers, Conservation and Indigenous Rights: An Impossible Balance? Indigenous Law Bulletin no. 7 (13):3-6.
 Neale, Timothy. 2012. The Wild Rivers Act controversy. The Conversation.
 Neale, Timothy. 2011. Duplicity of Meaning: wildness, indigeneity and recognition in the Wild Rivers Act debate. Griffith Law Review no. 20 (2):310-323.
 Slater, Lisa. 2013. 'Wild Rivers, Wild Ideas’: emerging political ecologies of Cape York Wild Rivers. Environment and Planning D: Society and Space no. 31 (5):763–778.

External links
Australia
 Maps of Australia's identified "wild" rivers
 Commonwealth Conservation Guidelines for Wild River management
 Queensland Government's Wild Rivers website
 Wilderness Society's Wild Rivers website
 Wild Rivers Code
 Submissions to Australian Senate Committee hearing into Wild Rivers (Environmental Management) Bill 2010 
 Submissions to Australian House of Representatives Standing Committee of Economics Review of the Wild Rivers (Environmental Management) Bill 2010
 Sound Recording of Australian Broadcasting Commission (ABC) Radio Report and Interviews on Wild Rivers (Qld)

Canada
 Canadian Heritage River System website
 Map of Designated and Nominated Heritage Rivers, Canada

New Zealand
 New Zealand's Wild Rivers campaign website

United States
 US "Wild and Scenic Rivers Act 1968"

Protected areas
Rivers